Goran Hunjak (born 13 November 1965 in Yugoslavia) is a retired football player.

Club career 
"Scorin" Goran Hunjak began his professional career in 1983 with for NK Zagreb in the Croatian First Division.  In 1988, he moved to the United States and signed with the Wichita Wings in Major Indoor Soccer League.  In 1992, the league collapsed and Hunjuk moved to the Baltimore Spirit in the National Professional Soccer League.  In 1994, the expansion Washington Warthogs which played a summer indoor soccer in the Continental Indoor Soccer League made Hunjak its first player when it selected him in the expansion draft.  He played one season with Washington where he was a first team All Star, then moved to the Kansas City Attack in the fall of 1994 for three seasons.  In January 1996, the Tampa Bay Mutiny drafted Hunjak.  He spent the 1996 season in Tampa Bay filling in as the team's play maker when Carlos Valderrama was with the Colombian national team.  In spring 1997, he signed with the Washington Warthogs of the Continental Indoor Soccer League. He returned to Major League Soccer after being drafted by the Kansas City Wizards in the first round (eighth overall) of 1998 MLS Supplemental Draft.
He returned to the NPSL, rejoining his previous team, the Kansas City Attack for the 1998-1999 season.  In 1999, he moved to the Philadelphia KiXX for two seasons before transferring to his final team, the Kansas City Comets in 2001.

References

External links 
 Hunjak page on the defunct Kansas City Comets' webpage
 MISL stats
 

1965 births
Living people
Footballers from Zagreb
Association football midfielders
Yugoslav footballers
Croatian footballers
NK Zagreb players
Wichita Wings (MISL) players
Baltimore Spirit players
Washington Warthogs players
Kansas City Attack players
Tampa Bay Mutiny players
Sporting Kansas City players
MLS Pro-40 players
Philadelphia KiXX players
Vermont Voltage players
Kansas City Comets (2001–2005 MISL) players
Continental Indoor Soccer League players
Major League Soccer players
Major Indoor Soccer League (1978–1992) players
Major Indoor Soccer League (2001–2008) players
National Professional Soccer League (1984–2001) players
USL League Two players
A-League (1995–2004) players
Yugoslav expatriate footballers
Croatian expatriate footballers
Expatriate soccer players in the United States
Yugoslav expatriate sportspeople in the United States
Croatian expatriate sportspeople in the United States
Sporting Kansas City draft picks